Mark Davies (born in South Africa) is a South African retired footballer.

Career

Davies was inspired to start playing football after watching South African Gary Bailey feature in the 1979 English FA Cup final.

After helping Manning Rangers, who he spent his entire professional career with, win their first league title in 1996/97, Davies helped the club go within three points of reaching the 1997/98 CAF Champions League final.

References

South African soccer players
Association football defenders
Living people
Manning Rangers F.C. players
Year of birth missing (living people)